Mulada, also known as Sa'wa, is a Bedouin village in the Negev desert in southern Israel.

History
The village was established following Government Resolution 881 on 29 September 2003, which created eight new Bedouin settlements (seven of which were to be located in the Abu Basma Regional Council).

The village covers 11,000 dunams (900 hectares) and is home to the al-Atrash and al-Hawashla tribes. It falls under the jurisdiction of Al-Kasom Regional Council.

References

See also
Bedouin in Israel

Arab villages in Israel
Al-Kasom Regional Council
Populated places in Southern District (Israel)
2003 establishments in Israel
Populated places established in 2003